Roque Esteban Scarpa Straboni (March 26, 1914 in Punta Arenas - January 11, 1995 in Santiago) was a Chilean writer, literary critic and scholar. He won the Chilean National Prize for Literature in 1980. He was of Croatian and Italian descent.

Scarpa served as professor of literature at the University of Chile and was a prominent member of the Chilean Academy of Language. In 1943 he founded the Teatro de Ensayo of the Catholic University of Chile. He was director of the National Library of Chile (1967–1971 and 1973–1977).

He also served as a literary critic in the newspapers El Mercurio and La Aurora.

Works 
Dos poetas españoles: Federico García Lorca, Rafael Alberti (1935)
Mortal mantenimiento (1942)
 Cancionero de Hammud (1942)
 Luz de ayer (poesía 1940-45) (1951)
Thomas Mann. Una personalidad en una obra (1961)
Una mujer nada de tonta (1976)
El árbol deshojado de sonrisas (1977)
No tengo tiempo: (poesía 1976) (1977)
 La desterrada en su patria: Gabriela Mistral en Magallanes: 1918-1920 (1977)
El laberinto sin muros (1981)

References

1914 births
1995 deaths
Chilean male writers
Chilean people of Croatian descent
Chilean people of Italian descent
People from Punta Arenas
National Prize for Literature (Chile) winners